Alan Davies (born 22 August 1944 in Ynysybwl) is a rugby union coach. He was coach of the Wales national rugby union team from 1991 to 1995, winning 18 of their 35 matches. Davies also coached Nottingham RFC, Notts, Lincs and Derbys, Midlands Division, England B and England, Bristol RFC.

References

External links
Wales profile

Welsh rugby union coaches
Wales national rugby union team coaches
Living people
People from Ynysybwl
Sportspeople from Rhondda Cynon Taf
1944 births
People educated at Carlton le Willows Academy